Rod Milne (born 15 March 1957) is a British sprinter. He competed in the men's 4 × 400 metres relay at the 1980 Summer Olympics. Milne is the founder and managing director of HFS Milbourne Financial Services Ltd, which he set up in October 1986.in March 2021 HFS Milbourne was acquired by Evelyn Partners

References

External links
 

1957 births
Living people
Athletes (track and field) at the 1980 Summer Olympics
British male sprinters
Olympic athletes of Great Britain
Place of birth missing (living people)
Members of Thames Valley Harriers